Ja-Ela Divisional Secretariat is a  Divisional Secretariat  of Gampaha District, of Western Province, Sri Lanka.

References
 Divisional Secretariats Portal
 http://www.jaela.ds.gov.lk

Divisional Secretariats of Gampaha District